The Mausoleum of Shah Abbas I is the burial place of Abbas I, the Safavid king of Persia. The mausoleum is located in Kashan, Iran. According to the dates on the mihrab of the tomb, the primary structure was built before 12th century. The structure was expanded in the Safavid era. In the southwestern portico, there is a rectangular stone, which originates in Caucasus.

Sources 

Mosques in Iran
Mausoleums in Iran
Buildings and structures in Kashan
Safavid dynasty
National works of Iran